The Matanzas State Forest is in the U.S. state of Florida. The  forest is located in northeastern Florida, near St. Augustine, though it is closer to Crescent Beach. Matanzas State Forest is bordered approximately by U.S. 1 to the west, State Road 206 to the north, the Matanzas River to the east, and the Faver-Dykes State Park to the south.

Besides being owned by the Florida State Division of Forestry, Matanzas State Forest is also co-managed in cooperation with the Florida Fish and Wildlife Conservation Commission and the St. Johns River Water Management District.

See also
List of Florida state forests
List of Florida state parks

References and external links

 Matanzas State Forest: Florida Division of Forestry- FDACS

Florida state forests
Protected areas of St. Johns County, Florida